Hubbell may refer to:

Places in the United States
 Hubbell, Indiana
 Hubbell, Michigan
 Hubbells, Missouri
 Hubbell, Nebraska

Other uses
 Hubble Space Telescope
 Hubble (crater), a lunar impact crater
 Hubble (film), a 2010 American documentary film
 Hubbell (surname)
 Hubbell Center, the museum, library, and archive of the Hubbell family in North America
 Hubbell Incorporated, an electric and electronic products manufacturer
 Hubbell connector, see "Twist-Lock connector"

See also
 Justice Hubbell (disambiguation)
 Hubble (disambiguation)